The 1986 Virginia Tech Hokies football team represented the Virginia Polytechnic Institute and State University during the 1986 NCAA Division I-A football season. The team's head coach was Bill Dooley.

Schedule

*Temple subsequently forfeited its entire 1986 schedule due to an ineligible player.

Rankings

Roster

References

Virginia Tech
Virginia Tech Hokies football seasons
Peach Bowl champion seasons
Virginia Tech Hokies football